The 2013 season was Persib Bandung's 54th season in the club football history and the 5th season competing in the Indonesia Super League. In 2013 the club plays in the Indonesia Super League.

They finished the season in fourth place with 63 points and Sergio van Dijk became the team top scorer with 21 goals, with it he equaled the total goals scored by Persib legend Sutiono Lamso in the 1994–95 season.

Review and events
Persib signed naturalized player Sergio van Dijk after the season had started. He made his debut against Persisam Putra Samarinda and scored a goal despite losing the match 2–1. In May 2013, Sriwijaya F.C. and Persib Bandung agreed to exchange players. Dzumafo moved to Sriwijaya and Hilton Moreira moved to Persib.

The match against Persija Jakarta that was due to be played in Gelora Bung Karno on 22 June 2013 was canceled after the bus that was used by the team and officials to reach the stadium was attacked by an unknown group. The rivalry between both clubs is well known; supporters of Persija Jakarta was suspected as the perpetrator of the attack. Police are still doing investigating the incident. PT. Liga Indonesia, which manages the Indonesia Super League, rescheduled the match to be played on 28 August 2013.

The postponed game result was a 1–1 draw. During the match, both sets of supporters clashed inside the stadium in the 16th minute, postponing the match for 20 minutes. Roy Suryo the Minister of Youth and Sports Affairs of Indonesia resigned to calm both parties. As a result of the incident, the disciplinary commission of the Football Association of Indonesia banned the Persib Bandung supporters from attending their next season's away games. The management appealed the verdict.

On 7 September 2013, the management confirmed that Persib Bandung would take part in the post-season friendly tournament Menpora Cup. They were drawn in the same group with Central Coast Mariners FC, Sriwijaya F.C. and Malaysia U-23. From originally five players, only Sergio van Dijk, Tony Sucipto and I Made Wirawan went to play in the 2013 Perang Bintang. The other two players, M. Ridwan and Supardi, were called back to join the team for the 2013 Menpora Cup.

Matches

Legend

Friendlies

Indonesia Super League

Squad

Squad, appearances and goals scored

Sources:

 

|}

Sources

External links 
 2013 Persib Bandung season at ligaindonesia.co.id 
 2013 Persib Bandung season at persib.co.id 
 2013 Persib Bandung season at soccerway.com

Persib Bandung
Indonesian football clubs 2013 season
Persib Bandung seasons